Keshtuiyeh (also Romanized as Keshtū’īyeh; also known as Geshītū’īyeh, Geshtū-īyeh, Gīshītūnīyeh, and Keshītū-īyeh) is a village in Sirch Rural District, Shahdad District, Kerman County, Kerman Province, Iran. At the 2006 census, its population was 113, in 28 families.

References 

Populated places in Kerman County